Andrew Briscoe (November 25, 1810 – October 4, 1849) was a merchant, revolutionary, soldier, and jurist. He was an organizer of the Texas Revolution, attending the Convention of 1836 and signing the Texas Declaration of Independence. He fought in three major battles, including the victory at San Jacinto. He was the first Chief Justice of Harrisburg County, Texas.

Early life
Andrew was born in Claiborne County, Mississippi on November 25, 1810.

Career
Briscoe emigrated to Texas, gained Mexican citizenship in 1833, then settled in Anahuac, Texas, where he opened a store. He was among the local businessmen who protested the manner in which Mexican authorities collected import duties. He was jailed with DeWitt Clinton Harris, catalyzing an armed confrontation led by William B. Travis, the second of the Anahuac Disturbances. He volunteered on behalf of the Texian rebels at the Battle of Concepción, Siege of Bexar, and led Company A, Infantry Regulars at the decisive Battle of San Jacinto.

Briscoe signed the Texas Declaration of Independence.

Briscoe was a delegate to the Texas Convention of 1836. After Texas Independence, President Sam Houston appointed him to serve as the first Chief Justice of Harrisburg County, later renamed Harris County, Texas. After his term ended in 1839, he retired from office and became a cattle dealer. In 1839, he planned a new railroad from town of Harrisburg, Texas to the Brazos River. He hired workers to grade a roadbed and lay ties for about two miles before running short of capital.

His wife, Mary Jane (Harris) Briscoe, was a surviving daughter of John Richardson Harris, who had received a land grant from the Austin Col ony, founded Harrisburg, Texas, and was the namesake of Harris County. Mary Jane Briscoe was not an heir, but the Briscoes did invest in Harrisburg.

Death and legacy
In the spring of 1849, Briscoe moved with his family to New Orleans, where he lived until his death on October 4. He is buried in the Texas State Cemetery in Austin, Texas.

Briscoe County, Texas, is named in his honor.

References

1810 births
1849 deaths
People from Houston
People from Claiborne County, Mississippi
Politicians from New Orleans
People of the Texas Revolution
Burials at Texas State Cemetery
Texas local politicians
19th-century American politicians
People from Anahuac, Texas
Signers of the Texas Declaration of Independence